George Salim Bayoud, Jr. (born 1955) is a real estate investor in Dallas, Texas.

Biography 
Bayoud serves on the board of The Beck Group, the Crossroads Group and Fund, and the Bayoud Group. He has served on the board or as a senior advisor for Lehman Brothers, the Dallas Cowboys, the Parks and Wildlife Foundation of Texas, Dallas Zoological Society, the Texas Business Hall of Fame, Texas Lyceum, Greater Dallas Crime Commission, D/FW Advisory Board of the Nature Conservancy, the Associate Board of Southern Methodist University Cox School of Business, Phoenix House of Texas, and the St. Mark's School of Texas, from which he graduated.

Bayoud graduated thereafter from the University of Texas at Austin, at which he was the president of the Texas Cowboys and interned in the office of Republican U.S. Senator John Tower. He served in both administrations of Texas Governor Bill Clements, first as personal assistant to the governor and, in his second term, as chief of staff and then as Secretary of State of Texas. At the time, he was the youngest secretary of state in the nation. After leaving government, Bayoud and Clements founded Raven Interests of Texas, Inc., a real estate investments firm, in Dallas.

His father, George Sr., an emigrant from Marjayoun, Lebanon, was a long-time surgeon at University of Texas Southwestern Medical Center in Dallas and was appointed in 1988 by Governor Clements to the Texas Board of Medical Examiners.

References

1955 births
Living people
20th-century American businesspeople
21st-century American businesspeople
American politicians of Lebanese descent
American real estate businesspeople
Businesspeople from Texas
People from Dallas
Secretaries of State of Texas
St. Mark's School (Texas) alumni
Texas Republicans
University of Texas at Austin alumni